Antodinga  is a rural commune in the region of Fitovinany eastern Madagascar.  It has a population of 15,977 inhabitants.

References

Populated places in Fitovinany